PPC may refer to:

Computing
 Personal programmable calculator, programmable calculators for personal use
 Pay-per-click, an internet advertising model
 PearPC, a PowerPC platform emulator
 Peercoin, a peer-to-peer cryptocurrency
 Peripheral pin controller, a feature present in the StrongARM CPU family that controls IO ports
 Pocket PC, Microsoft's specification for handheld devices
 ZEOS PPC, an early MS-DOS 5.0-based palmtop PC by ZEOS
 PowerPC, a microprocessor architecture
 PPC Ltd., a supplier of cement, lime, and related products in southern Africa
 Protected procedure call, a messaging facility in computer operating systems

Business and economics
 Presbyterian Publishing Corporation, a publishing agency of the American Presbyterian Church
 Production Possibility Curve, a graph that shows the different quantities of two goods that an economy could efficiently produce with limited productive resources
 Public Power Corporation (Δημόσια Επιχείρηση Ηλεκτρισμού), a Greek electric power company
 Practitioners Publishing Company, an imprint of Thomson Reuters Tax & Accounting

Engineering and construction 
 PPC Ltd., a South African cement producer
 PPC worldwide, a U.S.-based manufacturer of connector technology for the telecommunications, broadcast and wireless industries
 Partially premixed combustion, a modern combustion process intended to be used in internal combustion engines
 Powered parachute or paraplane, a type of aircraft

Entertainment and sports
 6mm PPC (Palmisano & Pindel Cartridge), a family of centerfire rifle cartridges for benchrest shooting sports
 Particle projection cannon, a fictional weapon in the BattleTech universe
 Peg + Cat, a TV series
 Police Pistol Combat, a type of target shooting competition
 Ppc Racing, a defunct NASCAR team
 Psychedelic Porn Crumpets, a rock band from Australia

Politics
 , the Costa Rican People's Party
 , a regional political party in Nicaragua
  (Christian People's Party), a Peruvian political party
 , the Catalan branch of People's Party, Spain
 Party for Progress and Concord, Rwanda
 People's Party of Canada, a conservative party founded by Maxime Bernier
 Peoples Planning Campaign (People's Plan Campaign), the Kerala experiment in decentralisation of powers to local governments 
 Pirate Party of Canada
 Pirate Party of Chile
 Poor People's Campaign founded by Martin Luther King Jr.
 Prospective parliamentary candidate, a role in politics in the United Kingdom

Science
 4-Phenyl-4-(1-piperidinyl)cyclohexanol, an organic chemical
 Pediatric Prehospital Care, an educational program offered by the National Association of Emergency Medical Technicians
 Polypropylene carbonate, a plastic
 Posterior parietal cortex, an association area involved in the integration of sensory information from multiple modalities

Other uses
 Pakistan Penal Code
 Petits Propos Culinaires, a journal of food studies and history
 Prior Park College, a Catholic private school in Bath, England

See also
 PPC-1 (Pipe Pacific Cable), an international communications link constructed by PIPE Networks